"Stiff Upper Lip" is a song by rock band AC/DC. This song is on their 2000 album Stiff Upper Lip, and it is composed by Angus and Malcolm Young. The song was released as a single, and topped the Billboard Hot Mainstream Rock Tracks chart. It was performed on Saturday Night Live on 18 March 2000.

Track listing
 "Stiff Upper Lip" – 3:34
 "Hard as a Rock" (Live) – 4:48
 "Ballbreaker" (Live) – 4:38

Music video
The music video, directed by Andy Morahan, starts with the band driving down the street in a red 1997 Hummer H1 when they get caught in a traffic jam. They then pull into a back alley, get out of the car, and begin to play the song on the street. The song that the band was listening to before the car jam was "It's a Long Way to the Top (If You Wanna Rock 'n' Roll)", a song released when the late Bon Scott was a member of the band.

Charts

Personnel
Brian Johnson – lead vocals
Angus Young – lead guitar
Malcolm Young – rhythm guitar, backing vocals
Cliff Williams – bass guitar, backing vocals
Phil Rudd – drums

References

External links
Lyrics

2000 songs
2000 singles
AC/DC songs
Blues rock songs
East West Records singles
Music videos directed by Andy Morahan
Song recordings produced by George Young (rock musician)
Songs written by Angus Young
Songs written by Malcolm Young

pt:Stiff Upper Lip